Myanmar National Television (MNTV) is a Burmese free-to-air television channel. MNTV was founded by Shwe Thanlwin and operated by Dream Vision Co.,Ltd.
 Launched on 1 October 2012, the channel was broadcast only on Skynet DTH. On 15 May 2014, it was broadcast as free-to-air channel. Its headquarters are located in 139/171/A, Lower Pazundaung Road, Botataung Township, Yangon.

Programming
Myanmar Idol (season 1) (2015)
Myanmar Idol (season 2) (2016)
Charm (2016)
Shwe Moe Ngwe Moe Thoon Phyo Lo Ywar (2016)
Yadanabon (2017)
Mingalar Shi Tae A Yat (2017)
Myanmar Idol (season 3) (2018)
74 Days of Love (2020)

See also 
Channel 9

Notes

References

External links

Television channels in Myanmar
Television channels and stations established in 2012
2012 establishments in Myanmar